Ayu Fani Damayanti (born 29 November 1988) is a former Indonesian tennis player. She made her debut as a professional in 2003, aged 14, at an ITF tournament in Jakarta.

Her greatest success came in doubles competitions, especially with Septi Mende as partner. The pair won five doubles titles on the ITF Women's Circuit, and the silver medal in doubles at the Southeast Asian Games in 2005. She won seven medals in total at the SEA Games from 2005 to 2015, including gold in the women's singles at the 2011 Southeast Asian Games in Palembang.

Damayanti was part of Indonesia Fed Cup team several times between 2005 and 2015. She was part of Indonesia's successful World Group II play-off against Puerto Rico in 2005. She and her partner Wynne Prakusya defeated the Puerto Rican pair in straight sets.

In 2008, Damayanti reached the final of the women's singles at the inaugural Garuda Indonesia Tennis Masters. She was defeated by Lavinia Tananta. However, she and partner Liza Andriyani won the women's doubles.

ITF finals

Singles (12–10)
{|
| valign=top align=left |

Doubles (19–14)

External links
 
 

Indonesian female tennis players
1988 births
Living people
People from Denpasar
Tennis players at the 2010 Asian Games
Southeast Asian Games gold medalists for Indonesia
Southeast Asian Games silver medalists for Indonesia
Southeast Asian Games bronze medalists for Indonesia
Southeast Asian Games medalists in tennis
Competitors at the 2005 Southeast Asian Games
Competitors at the 2009 Southeast Asian Games
Competitors at the 2011 Southeast Asian Games
Competitors at the 2015 Southeast Asian Games
Asian Games competitors for Indonesia
21st-century Indonesian women